The RTÉ Philharmonic Choir is an Irish choir, part of Irish public broadcaster RTÉ.

Organisation
The choir is part of RTÉ Performing Groups, and the chorus master is Mark Hindley.

The choir members, all of whom commit their services entirely voluntarily, meet each Wednesday from 7.30pm-10.00pm for rehearsals in the RTÉ Radio Centre and once a year gather for a residential training weekend which provides social opportunities alongside intensive workshops on technique, ensemble and repertoire.

Activities
The Choir has been at the centre of choral music in Ireland since its foundation by Colin Mawby in 1985 following the introduction of new choral policy. This 140 strong choir is the country's premier symphonic choral ensemble and has performed more than 52 of the major choral works since its foundation, mostly in conjunction with the RTÉ orchestras.  It broadcasts frequently on RTÉ lyric fm.

See also
 RTÉ National Symphony Orchestra
 RTÉ Concert Orchestra
 RTÉ Cór na nÓg
 RTÉ Vanbrugh Quartet

References

External links
 Official Site

Irish choirs
Philharmonic Choir
Musical groups established in 1985
1985 establishments in Ireland